Madadzi is a village/community in the province of Mashonaland West, Zimbabwe. It is located about 13 km southeast of Karoi in a tobacco-growing area. Most property in this area is for agricultural purposes. Buffalo Downs estate is located in this area.

Populated places in Mashonaland West Province